Balakliia or Balakliya is a city in Izium Raion, in Kharkiv Oblast (province), eastern Ukraine, on the north-east side of the Siverskyi Donets river close to where it is joined by the  which runs through the city. It is an important railroad junction in the oblast. In 2022 it had an estimated population of

Administrative status
Until 18 July 2020, Balakliia was the administrative center of Balakliia Raion. The raion was abolished in July 2020 as part of the administrative reform of Ukraine, which reduced the number of raions of Kharkiv Oblast to seven. The area of Balakliia Raion was merged into Izium Raion.

History

Early history and etymology
The land that is now Balakliia has been inhabited since ancient times. Settlements from the Neolithic Age and Bronze Age have been preserved.

The river's name in turn comes from a Turkic word meaning "fish river". The Brockhaus and Efron Encyclopedic Dictionary judges from the name of the settlement that the city was originally a Tatar settlement.

Russia and the Soviet Union
The modern history of the settlement as part of Russia and later Ukraine began in 1663, when it became populated by Russians and served as a guard post against raids from Crimean Tatars.

From 1817 to 1891, the settlement was known as Novo-Serpukhiv.

By the early 20th century, Balakliia had a population of 5197. Soviet control was established over Balakliia in December 1917, and it received city status in 1938. During World War II, the city was occupied by the Wehrmacht between December 9, 1941, and February 5, 1943.

2017–2019 arms depot explosions 

On 23 March 2017, 20,000 inhabitants of Balakliia were evacuated after  erupted at a nearby arms depot of the Balakliia military installation, which stockpiles missile and artillery ammunition. The disaster led to the death of one civilian woman and five others injured, with no casualties among the military. Thousands of residents within a 10 km radius around the complex were evacuated in the aftermath. By the end of March, the fires and resulting arms explosions at the ammunition depot in Balakliia had damaged almost 250 buildings. On 18 April, the city and nearby villages were cleared of unexploded ordnance.

On 3 May 2018 an ignition of dry grass led to a new series of explosions at the depot. 1,500 locals were evacuated and no casualties were reported. On November 15, 2019, another series of explosions killed two Ukrainian soldiers.

2022 Russian invasion of Ukraine

Russian capture and occupation 

On 3 March 2022, during the 2022 Russian invasion of Ukraine, Russian forces captured the city. Then-Mayor  initially stayed in the occupied city and cooperated with Russian occupation forces, telling the residents of the city that "[I]t’s complicated. It’s war." He urged the city's inhabitants not to engage in looting or "terrorist acts". On 28 March, the government of Ukraine began criminal proceedings against Stolbovyy on charges of treason and collaboration with Russia. In early April, he fled to Russia with his family.

The most senior military occupation officer at Balakliia was Colonel Ivan Popov, while the commandant in charge of "keeping the local civilian population in check" went by an apparent psuedonym of Commander "V. Granit" (Granite), and oversaw at least one interrogation center where Ukrainian civilians were "beaten and questioned using electric shocks", according to Balakliia residents and Ukrainian government officials.

The occupation force occupied a "run-down vehicle repair complex" on the outskirts of the city and used it as their command center for the occupation. Russian soldiers put up fliers "warning of Ukraine’s descent into Nazi rule" if the Ukrainian government regained control of the city, and "scribbled" on the walls of the military base.

Liberation by Ukraine 

On 6 September 2022, Ukrainian forces launched a counteroffensive towards the city, reportedly retaking the adjacent town of Verbivka and besieging the town. 
After crossing the Donets River, men of the 71st Jaeger Brigade led an offensive on Balakliia, coming from the direction of Husarivka. On 8 September, the Ukrainian flag was raised in the city after a brief battle, and on 10 September, Ukraine announced it had established control.

After they retook the town, Ukrainian officials said they had discovered torture chambers where Ukrainian prisoners were held. Serhiy Bolvinov, head of the Kharkiv Region National Police Investigation Department, stated that 40 people had been detained there. Ukrainian President Volodymyr Zelenskyy stated that more than 10 such torture chambers had been discovered in the Kharkiv region. Investigations were also opened against more alleged collaborators.

Power was restored in the city on 26 September 2022. On 25 November 2022, the Vinnytsia city council allocated 10 million hryvnias in funds to help rebuild the liberated Balaklia. Specifically, the funds are to be used to restore housing and improve heating services ahead of the winter.

Demographics

Image gallery

Notes

References

Cities in Kharkiv Oblast
Kharkov Governorate
Cities of district significance in Ukraine
Cities and towns built in the Sloboda Ukraine
Explosions in Ukraine
Explosions in 2017
2017 in Ukraine
Explosions in 2018
2018 in Ukraine
Populated places established in 1663